Scytodes longipes is a species of spitting spider in the family Scytodidae. It is found in Southern America, has been introduced into Pacific Islands, Guinea, Congo, Indonesia (Irian Jaya), and Australia (Queensland).

Subspecies
These two subspecies belong to the species Scytodes longipes:
 (Scytodes longipes longipes) Lucas, 1844
 Scytodes longipes simplex Franganillo, 1926

References

External links

 

Scytodidae
Articles created by Qbugbot
Spiders described in 1844